The Enemy Sex is a 1924 American silent drama film starring Betty Compson and directed by her husband James Cruze. It was produced by Famous Players-Lasky and released by Paramount Pictures. It is taken from the 1914 novel The Salamander by Owen Johnson.

Cast

Preservation

A print of The Enemy Sex is preserved at the Library of Congress, Packard Campus.

References

External links

Still with Dorothy Dwan at gettyimages.com
 book cover of Owen Johnson's book The Salamander (Yesterday's Gallery & Babylon Revisited, rare books

1924 films
American silent feature films
Films directed by James Cruze
Paramount Pictures films
1924 drama films
Silent American drama films
American black-and-white films
Films based on American novels
1920s American films
1920s English-language films